Niger East Senatorial District, known as Zone B within Niger State in Nigeria, Covers 9 local governments which include:
Bosso local government area 
Chanchaga local government area 
Munya local government area 
Paiko local government area 
Rafi local government area 
Shiroro local government area 
Suleja local government area 
Tafa local government area 
Gurara local government area. 

Niger East Senate district has 90 electoral wards. Mohammed Sani Musa of the All Progressive Congress, APC is the current representative of Niger East Senate District.

List of senators representing Niger East

References 

Politics of Niger State
Senatorial districts in Nigeria